The Drake Bulldogs are an NCAA Division I Football Championship Subdivision non-scholarship college football program representing Drake University. They currently compete in the non-scholarship Pioneer Football League and have been charter members of the conference  since 1993.  Drake began playing intercollegiate football in 1893.

History

Scholarship era
The 1922 Drake Bulldogs football team is considered by many to be the greatest in Drake history and is, to date, the only undefeated Bulldog team. Drake capped the historic season with a 48–6 triumph over Mississippi State on November 25, 1922. They received votes as the number one team in the College Football Researchers Association poll and were invited to the White House for their accomplishments. The Bulldogs were coached by legend Ossie Solem.

During the 1926 Homecoming activities, Babe Ruth visited and suited up for a Drake scrimmage. Head coach Ossie Solem extended the invitation stating "We finally inquired had he ever indulged in the 'dirt eating' pastime known as football. The answer was sort of a woeful 'No.' It was evident that the 'Big Bimbo' had missed something in his boyhood days, and when the invitation to work out with the Bulldogs was extended, it was accepted with glee." Ruth scored a 20-yard touchdown in the mock scrimmage.

Following the 1931 season head coach Ossie Solem scheduled a game in Honolulu, Hawaii in which the bulldogs squared off against Hawaii. Solem, who was frustrated by the lack of postseason rewards (the Rose Bowl on January 1, 1932, was the only NCAA Bowl Game following 1931 season), called the trip a reward for his team's fourth straight Missouri Valley Conference championship.

In a close encounter at Honolulu Stadium on December 19, 1931, Hawaii defeated Drake 19–13 in a game dubbed the Aloha Classic. The game was the first by an Iowa school in the state of Hawaii. It was also the last game for Solem as Bulldog coach. He left the next season taking the head football coach vacancy at Iowa.

Drake was the first school of its size to install lights. On October 6, 1928, the Bulldogs defeated Simpson College 41–6 in the first night game at Drake Stadium.

In 1951, Johnny Bright was named a First Team College Football All-American, and was awarded the Nils V. "Swede" Nelson Sportsmanship Award. He was invited to the Heisman Trophy festivities and finished fifth in the voting.

In 1969, Bright was named Drake University's greatest football player of all time. Bright is the only Drake football player to have his jersey number (#43) retired by the school, and in June 2006, received honorable mention from ESPN.com senior writer Ivan Maisel as one of the best college football players to ever wear #43. In February 2006, the football field at Drake Stadium, in Des Moines, Iowa, was named in his honor. In November 2006, Bright was voted one of the CFL's Top 50 players (#19) of the league's modern era by Canadian sports network TSN.

In 1972, the Bulldogs returned to their first bowl appearance in 3 years. They captured a share of the Missouri Valley Conference Championship, after being away from the league for 20 years, with a 4-1 record in conference play. The only conference loss was to 18th AP Ranked Louisville (Led by Tom Jackson, All-Pro Linebacker, Denver Broncos, and former ESPN Analyst). They went on to play Tennessee State and Ed 'Too Tall' Jones (All-Pro Defensive End, Dallas Cowboys) in the Pioneer Bowl, which proved to be a difficult challenge in a 29-7 loss, finishing with a 7-5 record overall. During this return to bowl competition, coach Jim Johnson was the defensive coordinator and Jack Wallace was the head coach. In 1999, Jim Johnson became the Defensive Coordinator for the Philadelphia Eagles under head coach Andy Reid. 

The most successful Drake team in the modern era of college football was the 1981 Bulldogs team. Drake finished the season with 10 wins and nearly had an undefeated season. The Bulldogs lost 59–6 to Tulsa ending their chance at a perfect season. With a 7–4–0 record, Tulsa clinched the lone Missouri Valley Conference postseason berth due to the head-to-head tie-breaker. Both teams finished conference play 7–1–0.

Modern era
Following the historic 1981 season, the Bulldogs suffered five straight non-winning seasons. In 1986, the school chose not to award athletic scholarships ("grants-in-aid") to football players. It was unclear if Drake football would survive until Des Moines, Iowa native Rob Ash was introduced as coach in 1989.

Ash rejuvenated the program during his eighteen seasons at Drake and played a crucial role in the founding of the Pioneer Football League, a football-only league run out of the Missouri Valley Conference offices in St. Louis, Missouri. In the process, he became Drake's all-time winningest coach with a record of 125–63–2; leading the Bulldogs to four conference titles and five runners-up finishes in the Sports Network Cup. As a result, Ash was named the conference coach of the year three times (1995, 1998, and 2004).

After the 2006 season, Ash accepted the head football coach position at Montana State. In his final Drake season, he led the team to a runner-up finish in both the Pioneer Football League and the Sports Network Cup. Ironically, San Diego defeated Drake in both, marking the first time two Pioneer Football League teams finished first and second in the Sports Network Cup.

The Bulldogs were coached by long-time NFL assistant Steve Loney in 2007. The team finished 6–5, with a highlight 27–24 victory over #7 Illinois State on August 30. Loney resigned at the end of the season to accept a position as offensive line coach with the St. Louis Rams.

Chris Creighton was named head coach beginning with the 2008 season. In 2009, the Bulldogs missed out on a share of the conference title when Butler connected on a field goal with one second remaining in the regular season finale. In 2011, Drake shared the conference title with San Diego, their first title under Creighton. They would share the title again in 2012.

Rick Fox was named the head coach in December 2013, and coached his first game in the 2014 season.  Fox coached his most successful season in 2017, when the Bulldogs finished 2nd in the PFL with a conference record of 6–2.

Pioneer Football League series records

Championships

Notable games

1930 Soldier Field night game
Drake played the first night game at Soldier Field, losing a close contest to Oregon 14–7 on October 3, 1930. This was the first intersectional night game ever played in Chicago, Illinois. The Drake vs. Oregon game was followed by Loyola vs. Georgetown.

1938 double-header
On September 23, 1938, Drake won two games in the same day. The Bulldogs defeated Central 45–0 in the afternoon game, followed by a 47–0 win over Monmouth in the evening game.

Johnny Bright incident

The Johnny Bright incident was a violent on-field assault against African-American player Johnny Bright by White American player Wilbanks Smith during an American college football game held on October 20, 1951 in Stillwater, Oklahoma. The game was significant in itself as it marked the first time that an African American athlete with a national profile and of critical importance to the success of his Drake University team had played against Oklahoma A&M (now Oklahoma State University) on their home field. Bright's injury also highlighted the racial tensions of the times and assumed notoriety when it was captured in what was later to become both a widely disseminated and eventually Pulitzer Prize winning photo sequence. The event later came to be known as the "Johnny Bright Incident".

Global Kilimanjaro Bowl

On September 1, 2010, Drake announced it would forgo its normal postseason tie-ins in order to participate in the Global Kilimanjaro Bowl, the first American Football game in Africa. The Bulldogs solidified their spot in the game, securing a winning season with their sixth win on October 30, 2010 (a 38–17 defeat of San Diego).

Drake continued their success during the 2011 season after the victory in the Kilimanjaro Bowl. The Bulldogs shared the Pioneer Football League title. Coach Creighton and his team were honored with the NCAS Giant Steps Award for their charity work in Africa. They were also featured in a documentary by CBS Sports for their work in Africa.

2018 game vs. Iowa State

On December 1, 2018, Drake played FBS 23rd-ranked Iowa State in a makeup game for both schools. The game did not count toward bowl eligibility for Iowa State but served as a 12th game for their seniors.

Despite being 41-point underdogs, FCS non-scholarship Drake held its own, holding a 24–20 lead in late in the third quarter before eventually falling 27–24. Nevertheless, Drake played a memorable game and almost pulled off one of the biggest upsets ever in college football.

All-time records

Bowl games

Seasons
See List of Drake Bulldogs football seasons

Individual honors

Retired numbers
 

Notes

National Football Foundation College Football Hall of Famers

References

External links

 

 
American football teams established in 1893
Drake Bulldogs